Novopokrovka is a village (a selo) in the Polohy Raion (district) of Zaporizhzhia Oblast in southern Ukraine. 

Until 18 July 2020, Novopokrovka belonged to Orikhiv Raion. The raion was abolished that day as part of the administrative reform of Ukraine, which reduced the number of raions of Zaporizhzhia Oblast to five. The area of Orikhiv Raion was merged into Polohy Raion.

References

Villages in Polohy Raion